Cleophas (Cle) Newhook (June 3, 1943 – March 2, 2018) was a Canadian theologian, author and politician in Newfoundland.

Newhook was leader of the Newfoundland and Labrador New Democratic Party from 1989 to 1992 but was unsuccessful in several attempts to win a seat for himself in the House of Assembly. Prior to becoming party leader he was the NDP's executive secretary as well as a candidate. He became leader by defeating MHA Gene Long by a margin of 126 votes to 105 in the party's first-ever leadership convention in 1989. A provincial election was held several weeks after Newhook became leader and the party lost its two seat in the face of a Liberal surge that saw NDP support drop 10 points and move to the Liberals allowing the Liberals led by Clyde Wells to defeat the Conservative government. In 1990, while Newhook was leader, the NDP regained a seat in the House when Jack Harris won a by-election victory in St. John's East. Newhook attempted to win a seat for himself in a 1991 by-election in Trinity North but was unsuccessful despite a strong showing. In his fifth attempt to win a seat, a 1992 by-election in  Ferryland, he came in third. A month later, Newhook announced  that he would step down as NDP leader; he was succeeded by MHA Jack Harris.

Outside of his political career he was a university administrator as co-ordinator of student services at Memorial University as well as the university's chaplain. He was best known for being the director of the Ocean Ranger Families Foundation, a non-profit foundation established after the 1982 oil rig disaster that killed 84 men. The foundation organized the victims' families so that they could be represented at a public inquiry and lobbied for legislative changes to prevent future oil rig disasters

Newhook studied theology at the University of Oxford and spent five years as an Anglican priest in England where he directed community educational and development programs in inner cities and was chair of the British Association of Settlements and Social Action Centre.

More recently, Newhook has been a marketing consultant and the director of Landscape Newfoundland and Labrador. He served on the provincial Electoral Districts Boundary Commission in 2006.
In the 1989 federal NDP leadership convention Newhook backed Audrey McLaughlin's campaign.

Newhook died on March 2, 2018, due to a short bout with cancer.

References

1943 births
2018 deaths
Newfoundland and Labrador religious figures
Canadian Anglican priests
Leaders of the Newfoundland and Labrador NDP/CCF
Newfoundland and Labrador New Democratic Party MHAs
Candidates in Newfoundland and Labrador provincial elections
Deaths from cancer in Newfoundland and Labrador